Albany High School (AHS) in Albany, New York, United States, is a public high school with an enrollment of about 2,600 students for the 2017–18 school year. The school is part of the City School District of Albany. It opened on September 7, 1868, as the Albany Free Academy. Albany High has been located at 700 Washington Avenue since 1974. The school is an International Baccalaureate school with an Advanced Placement program.  The school newspaper is The Nest (published online, it replaced the longtime print newspaper The Patroon, in 2012), the literary magazine is Inkblot, and the yearbook is Prisms.

History
On September 7, 1868, when the Albany Free Academy opened its doors to the public, there were 141 students enrolled. For a time, the school was located in Van Vechten Hall at 119 State Street until it was relocated to Eagle Street on May 4, 1876, where it is now (where the Albany County Courthouse can be found). In the year 1913, the school was relocated to a new location that was more centrally located between Washington Avenue and Western Avenue so that it would be more accessible for students. Currently, there is a building that used to house Philip Schuyler Elementary School, which was located within the "old" Albany High School building, which is still standing to this day. Prior to 1974, Albany had two high schools which were known as the Albany High School and the Philip Schuyler High School. In that same year, the two schools merged to become the "new" Albany High. The school is currently located at 700 Washington Avenue, in the same building where both schools once stood.

As far back as 2006, the school had four cafeterias, namely the Northeast, Northwest, Southeast, and Southwest cafeterias. As a result, the walls between these two sets of cafeterias were demolished and two large cafeterias were formed known as the North and South cafeterias, respectively.

In 2000 only one entrance was used for the school so that students could go through a security checkpoint. Numerous bomb threats made by anonymous phone call and scrawlings on the bathroom wall shut down classes so that the grounds could be searched by the Albany Fire Department in winter of 2000.

In 2006, metal detectors were again installed at student entrance points to the school because of fights that took place within the school. The metal detectors were donated by the Albany Police Department. All students now have to go through a security checkpoint upon entering the school.

There was a time during the 2011-2012 school year when Albany High School was divided into two large administrative divisions known as the "North House" and the "South House". It was common for each house to have its own cafeteria and administrative offices. In some cases, class assignments were determined by the house of a student, and this was done by drawing lots at the time of registration.

In 2011, the school created four themed learning communities referred to as academies (Citizenship Academy, Discovery Academy, Innovation Academy, and Leadership Academy). As a result of the establishment of these four academies, students have access to additional support staff and have the opportunity to experience a themed academic environment while still in high school, as well. It is important to note that all of Albany High's students are assigned to one of the four academies. The Citizenship and Innovation Academies share the former South House cafeteria, while the Discovery and Leadership Academies share the former North House cafeteria. All elective courses within the school are grouped according to the theme of a particular academy; however, regardless of the academy a student is enrolled in, he or she may take any elective course within the school. In order to encourage more students to attend the "redesigned" Albany High School, the school started advertising itself by placing advertisements at the bus stops in late 2010 in order to encourage more students to attend the school. In the advertisements, there were pictures of students engaged in educational activities and the slogan "Four New Academies, One Great Education" was displayed.

In November 2015, city voters defeated a $196 million plan to renovate and expand Albany High by a close vote of 5,794 to 5,897.

Albany High School is the only comprehensive public high school in the city. The school is divided into four themed learning communities known as academies. Those academies are Citizenship Academy, which focuses on critical thinking and economic skills; Discovery Academy, which focuses on the arts and communication; Innovation Academy, which focuses on science, technology, engineering, and math; and Leadership Academy, which focuses on the skills needed to lead the way to a better future. All students in the school are a member of at least one of the four academies. Albany High School also includes the Abrookin Career and Technical Education Center, which is located three blocks away from the main high school campus. Abrookin's programmatic offerings include career and technical education (CTE) pathways such as culinary arts, cosmetology, construction technology, automotive technology and health sciences, to name a few.

In 2021, Onovu Otitigbe-Dangerfield became the first black valedictorian in the school's 152-year history.

Academics
Albany High has a wide variety of academic programs, including a longstanding Advanced Placement program offering 19 courses. In 2005, AHS was accredited as an International Baccalaureate World School and introduced an IB Diploma Program, which consists of a series of college-level courses for juniors and seniors leading to an alternative diploma. Every year, several IB or AP students typically attend some of the nation's top-ranked universities, including those in the Ivy League. Albany High has made Newsweek'''s list of America's Top Public High Schools on multiple occasions, most recently in 2010 (when it ranked 976)."Albany school gets a favorable rating". Albany Times Union, September 25, 2009. The ranking is based on the Challenge Index, which calculates the number of AP and IB exams taken at a school divided by the number of graduating seniors.

Most academic courses are taught at Core, Regents, and Honors levels. Three foreign languages (Spanish, French, Chinese), are available. Within New York State, AHS was one of the first public schools outside of New York City to offer any form of Chinese as a foreign language. The school also has Senior Career Explorations (internships) in six areas and a Project Lead the Way engineering program. An annex, the Abrookin Vocation-Technical Center, offers many career and technical courses

School receivership
In 2015 the New York State Education Department classified Albany High School as a "Struggling School" and placed it under the school receivership of the Superintendent of the City School District of Albany. If the school does not demonstrate improvement in student performance within two years an Independent Receiver will be  appointed by the district to serve under contract to the State Education Commissioner, and the district will have no control over decisions affecting the school.

Academies

All students at Albany High are within one of four themed academies (Citizenship, Discovery, Innovation, and Leadership Academies). Students can apply to one of the academies through a lottery system several months in advance of an incoming school year. Students who don't apply before the deadline will be randomly assigned an academy upon entry. Many academic courses are group to a particular academy within the school; for example, the psychology courses are grouped to Leadership Academy. However, any student in the school can take any course regardless of his or her academy. The four academies are located in physical areas of the school.

Citizenship Academy

Citizenship Academy focuses on effective communications, critical thinking, and preparations for a global economy. Advanced mathematics electives are grouped to this academy. Other courses grouped to this academy include culinary arts, family and consumer sciences courses, and business courses. The motto of this academy is "The future depends on what we do today." The color of this academy is green.

Discovery Academy

Discovery Academy focuses on the arts and communication. Advanced English electives are grouped to this academy. Other electives grouped to this academy include advanced art courses, theater/drama courses, and all music courses. The motto of this academy is "Imagine the possibilities." Its color is yellow.

Innovation Academy

Innovation Academy focuses on science, technology, engineering, and math. Advanced science electives are grouped to this academy. Other electives grouped to this academy include all Project Lead the Way engineering courses. Innovation Academy hosts themed luncheons known as "food for thought power lunches". During these events, a technologist visits and talks with students about a certain topic in the science and technology field. The motto of this academy is "Invent the future." Its color is red.

Leadership Academy

Leadership Academy focuses on civic and social responsibilities. Advanced social studies courses are grouped to this academy. Other courses electives grouped to this academy include adolescent psychology and language courses. Leadership Academy hosts themed luncheons known as "Lunch with A Leader". During those events, a local leader such as a politician or philanthropist visits to talk about making a difference in the world. Visitors to these events included Albany mayor Gerald Jennings and Miss New York 2011, Kaitlin Monte. The motto of this academy is "Be the change you want to see in the world." Its color is blue.

Clubs
Albany High School has a number of clubs; among the more active of these are the Falcon Council, the Albany Marching Falcons and Color Guard, Albany Indoor Percussion Ensemble, Albany Falcons Winter Guard, Drama Club, Speech and Debate Team, FIRST Robotics, Inkblot (a literary club), Prisms (the yearbook club), NYODA Step Team, International Club, Key Club, Habitat for Humanity Club, Chess Club, Ski Club, Hike Club, Math Club, Art Club, Video Production Club, Jam Club (playing rock music), Captains' Club, Peace & Social Action Club, Anime Club, Fashion Club, Jewish Student Union, National Honor Society, Masterminds, Mock Trial, Gay/Straight Alliance, and Best Buddies. In addition, the school has a club for each of the four languages offered. In the 2011–2012 school year, a class of journalism students renamed and revamped the school paper "The Patroon" and created the student-run, web-based "The Nest". In December 2014 the City School District of Albany established a Junior Reserve Officers' Training Program (JROTC) at Albany High School named the Henry Johnson Battalion in honor of SGT Johnson. Currently the program enrolls over 100 cadets. In February 2017, the JROTC drill team was invited to compete in the official US Army Junior ROTC drill championships.

Athletics

Albany High School's interscholastic athletics program is affiliated with the New York State Public High School Athletic Association (Section II). Albany High's student-athletes competed in the Big Ten Conference for many years until the conference disbanded following the 2013–14 school year. Fall interscholastic sports include American football, cross country, and soccer for men; cheerleading, volleyball, tennis, cross country, soccer and swimming/diving for women; and golf for men and women. Winter sports include swimming/diving and wrestling for men; cheerleading and step/drill for women; and basketball (which had its best seasons under great longtime coach Paul Lyons), bowling, and indoor track for men and women. Spring sports include baseball and tennis for men; softball and step/drill for women; and outdoor track for men and women. Many sports are played at both varsity and junior varsity levels, and intramural activities are also offered. Albany High School soccer team in 2007 after almost 25 years made it through the sectional to semi final beaten the power house in big ten LaSalle, beating Saratoga High School in the 2nd round and beating Colonie Central High in the quarter final but losing to Niskayuna High School in semi final. 
Then in 2013 Albany high set the bar higher when they defeated 3rd seed Bethlehem and 1st seed Shenendehowa to make it to the finals in sectionals but eventually losing to 2nd seed Guilderland.

Campus
Albany High's current location at 700 Washington Avenue, which opened in 1974. The school consists of three brick buildings connected by indoor pedestrian bridges. The largest of these, the academic building, contains the classrooms, cafeterias, and media center. Across from the academic structure are the physical education building (housing the gymnasiums, locker rooms, and HVAC equipment) and another building containing the main office, auditorium, and music classrooms. Three bridges on the second floor connect the buildings.

Academic building

The academic building is the largest edifice on the Albany High School campus and the only one with three stories. The ground floor contains the two cafeterias (Citizenship/Innovation and Discovery/Leadership), kitchen, special education classrooms, technology classrooms, art studios, a recently opened school store known as "Falcons Rock", a Model U.N. room, a mock courtroom, various other classrooms, and even a credit union room known as the "Falcon Branch". The second floor is the main hub of the school because it is connected to the other two buildings by the pedestrian bridges. It contains the media center (the large school library housing over 26,000 books as well as PC desktop computers). The library was fully renovated in 2012. The second floor also contains the college center (a relatively new room with computers intended to be used by students to research colleges), and many classrooms. The third floor is entirely occupied by classrooms. All the science labs are located on this floor.

The dominant architectural feature of the rectangular building is its six towers, numbered one through six. Towers One, Two, and Three are on the west side, and Towers Four, Five, and Six are on the east side. The towers contain stairwells, restrooms, and assorted offices (Tower Two contains the school's elevator). They also have skylights above each stairwell. Students in Citizenship and Innovation Academies enter the school through Tower Six while students in Discovery and Leadership Academies enter through Tower Four.

The bulk of the Innovation Academy classrooms are located in the southern half of the first and second floors. The bulk of the Discovery Academy classrooms are located in the northern half of the second floor. The third floor of the academic building contains the bulk of the Leadership Academy and Citizenship Academy classrooms. The bulk of the Citizenship Academy classrooms are located in the southern half of the building and the bulk of the Leadership Academy are located in the northern half of the building. The four academies form academy wings painted their own distinct color (green for Citizenship Academy, gold for Discovery Academy, red for Innovation Academy, and blue for Leadership Academy) and has its own academy office and health office. The large guidance suite located in the Discovery Academy wing on the second floor provides all four academies with a set number of guidance counselors.

Room numbers in the academic building have three digits, with the first digit indicating the floor number. The other two digits depend on the side of the building, with the rooms of the northern half having odd numbers and the rooms of the Southern Half having even numbers. Rooms numbers increase as one goes towards the center of the building.

Physical education building
The physical education building contains the indoor athletic facilities. These include the main gymnasium (which can be divided into three smaller gyms using motorized curtains), "Rubber Gym" (a smaller gym named for its floor material), wrestling gym, dance studio, and six-lane swimming pool. The building also houses the male and female locker rooms, the athletic health office, the athletic director's office, and the Falcon Fitness Center, a recently renovated weight room. On the first floor of the two story building is the boiler room housing the school's heating equipment. The two air conditioning units are located on the roof.

Auditorium building
The third building on the Albany High campus houses the auditorium, main offices, and music classrooms. The diamond shaped auditorium has red cushioned seats, a triangular stage, and a catwalk area which is accessible by ladder. Located on the ground floor, the music facilities include a rehearsal rooms, choir room, office, and several practice rooms. The auditorium building contains the main lobby and serves as an entrance for school visitors.

Courtyard

The courtyard is located between the three buildings. A brick and concrete space with small trees and many benches, it serves as an entrance place for students during the morning. Senior year students have the privilege of eating lunch here. The school's three walkway bridges pass over the courtyard. Its concrete pavement was resurfaced in 2011.

Athletic fields
The Albany High campus contains athletic fields for soccer, baseball, American football, and softball. The school's running track was resurfaced in 2003. Albany High's varsity football, soccer and baseball teams play their games at nearby Bleecker Stadium.

Abrookin Career and Technical Center
The Abrookin Career and Technical Center (formerly known as Abrookin Vocational-Technical Center) is a disconnected building of Albany High School located three blocks north of the main campus at 99 Kent Street. The building offers many career and technical courses in fields such as construction, cooking, electricity, engineering, cosmetology, computers (including a Cisco networking academy), and even an emergency medical technician course. It also houses family and consumer sciences courses. Students can walk to Abrookin from the main campus for a 1 to 3 period-long class. It takes about eight minutes to walk from the main campus to Abrookin. The building opened in 1974 as the Albany Occupational Center. The building was later renamed after the late school board member Manny Abrookin (1922–1994).

Demographics
Of Albany High School's approximately 2,600 students, about 54% are African-American, 21% are White (non-Hispanic), 13% are Hispanic, 11% are Asian, and 1% are Native American or multiracial. The school has about 159 teachers and 49 other professional staff, with a student-to-teacher ratio of approximately 14:1.
Albany High enrolls students from more than 40 foreign nations.

Notable alumni
Glen Barker – Houston Astros outfielder
Alex Gordon (rugby union) Rugby flanker for Allegheny Rugby Union
Tracy Baskin –  Former Olympiac track and field athlete in the 800 meters, former 4 by 4 co-world record holder, #3 rank 1988 US men 800m
Carolee Carmello – Broadway actress who made her Broadway debut in City of Angels; she starred in Lestat, Parade and Mamma Mia!''.
Lionel Chalmers – Basketball player who went to Xavier University and the NBA. He was drafted by the L.A. Clippers and traded to the Minnesota Timberwolves for the 2005–2006 NBA season.
Gene Cretz – Class of 1968 – former U.S. Ambassador to Libya, and U.S. Ambassador to Ghana; taught English at Albany High from 1977 to 1979.
William Devane – Film and television actor
Alfred Freedman, M.D. – Class of 1933 – Psychiatrist who headed the American Psychiatric Association when it declared homosexuality was not a mental disorder in 1973.
Stefon Harris – Class of 1991 – Jazz musician, vibraphonist
Charlie Leigh – NFL player for the 17–0 1972 Miami Dolphins Super Bowl Champions, primarily as a kick returner
 James Hilton Manning, mayor of Albany
Catherine McCabe – Class of 1969 –  Acting Administrator of the Environmental Protection Agency in 2017
Michael Premo – Class of 1999 – Award-winning artist, activist, and organizer. He is a central figure in the Occupy Wall Street  and Occupy Sandy movements, co-director of the participatory documentary, Sandy Storyline and creator of the documentary project Housing is a Human Right.
Carrie Turner – Popular New York actress in the 1880s and 1890s.
Charlayne Woodard – Award-winning American film, stage and television actor and playwright

Principals
1868 – 1886: John E. Bradley
1886 – 1911: Oscar D. Robinson
1911 – 1916: Frank A. Gallup
1916 – 1951: Harry E. Pratt
1951 – 1959: Stanley Heason
1959 – 1967: Douglas W. Lincoln
1968 – 1986: John Bach
1987 – 1995: David McGuire
1995 – 1998: Willard Washburn
1998 – 2001: John Metallo
2001 – 2002: John Pellitier
2002 – 2006: Michael T. Cioffi
2006 – 2009: F. Maxine Fantroy-Ford
2009 – 2012: David C. McCalla
2012 – 2015: Cecily L. Wilson-Turner
2015 – 2018: Dale Getto
2018 – : Jodi M. Commerford

See also
 Albany City School District
 List of high schools in New York

References

Albany High School History

External links

 Albany High School website
Albany City School District website

1868 establishments in New York (state)
Buildings and structures in Albany, New York
Educational institutions established in 1868
Education in Albany, New York
International Baccalaureate schools in New York (state)
Public high schools in Albany County, New York
Organizations based in Albany, New York